The 1992 Navy Midshipmen football team represented the United States Naval Academy (USNA) as an independent during the 1992 NCAA Division I-A football season. The team was led by third-year head coach George Chaump.

Schedule

Personnel

References

Navy
Navy Midshipmen football seasons
Navy Midshipmen football